Butsni is a village in Letychiv hromada (Летичівська селищна громада), Khmelnytskyi Raion, Khmelnytskyi Oblast, Ukraine.  In the past it was known as Butsnevtsy (Polish: Bucniowce, Russian: Буцневцы / Буцнёвцы, Ukrainian: Буцніовци, Буцнівці), a small town in Poland, Russian Empire, Ukraine and early Soviet Union. It was devastated during World War II.

According to the 2001 Ukraine Census, the population was 201.

History
In 1880 it  had  population of 580, including 16 persons of odnodvortsy (petty szlachta deprived of nobility in Russian Empire after the Partitions of Poland) and 90 Jews.
According to the 1897 Russian census, its population was 1265, of which 304 were Jews.

Jewish history
In Yiddish, it was called Butsnevits, and the search of this shtetl was the subject of Jack Rothman's book Searching for Butsnevits: A Shtetl Tale (2016)  - the place where his ancestors lived.

The fate of the Jews of Butsnevtsy is discussed, along with other Jewish communities of Letichev district, in the two-volume set by David A. Chapin and Ben Weinstock, The Road from Letichev 

The neglected old Jewish cemetery is located in the wood nearby and is used for cattle grazing. Found tombstones date in the range from 1749 to 1871.

References

Shtetls
Villages in Khmelnytskyi Raion